Qiming Venture Partners is a China based Venture capital firm. It primarily invests in Technology, Internet and Healthcare related companies across China. It was an early investor in ByteDance, Xiaomi, Meituan and Bilibili. According to South China Morning Post, from January 2019 to May 2020, it was the seventh most active venture capital firm in China.

Background 
Qiming Venture Partners was founded in 2006 by Gary Rieschel and Duane Kuang. Rieschel and Kuang were previously with Softbank and Intel Capital respectively.  It is headquartered in Shanghai with offices in Beijing, Suzhou, Shenzhen and Hong Kong. It mainly focuses on investments in China.

In 2017, it set up its American branch, Qiming Venture Partners (USA). The branch is headquartered in Seattle, Washington with offices in Cambridge, Massachusetts and San Francisco, California.

Funds

USD Funds

RMB Funds

Notable investments 

 ByteDance
 Xiaomi
 Meituan
 Bilibili
 Zhihu
 CanSino Bio
 Schrödinger, Inc.
 UBtech Robotics
 Insilico Medicine
 Megvii
 APUS Group
RedDoorz
Mogujie

References

External links
 www.qimingvc.com (Company Website)

Financial services companies established in 2006
Venture capital firms of China
Venture capital firms of the United States